The Mexican garter snake (Thamnophis eques) is a species of snake of the family Colubridae. It is found in Mexico and in the United States (Arizona and New Mexico). This essentially harmless snake is semi-aquatic and most of the 10 recognized subspecies are restricted to lake basins in Mexico.

Subspecies
Ten subspecies are known:

Mexican garter snake, T. e. eques (Reuss, 1834)
Laguna Totolcingo garter snake, T. e. carmenensis Conant, 2003
T. e. cuitzeoensis Conant, 2003
T. e. diluvialis Conant, 2003
T. e. insperatus Conant, 2003
northern Mexican garter snake, T. e. megalops (Kennicott, 1860)
T. e. obscurus Conant, 2003
T. e. patzcuaroensis Conant, 2003
T. e. scotti Conant, 2003
T. e. virgatenuis Conant, 1963

References 

Thamnophis
Reptiles described in 1834
Taxa named by Adolph Reuss
Reptiles of Mexico
Reptiles of the United States